Lyonetia anthemopa is a moth in the  family Lyonetiidae. It is known from Japan (Honshu, Kyushu, Yakushima) and Taiwan.

The wingspan is 5–8 mm. There are four generations per year in Japan.

The larvae feed on Pyracantha angustifolia, Pyracantha crenurata, Rhapiolepis umbellata and Photinia taiwanensis. They mine the leaves of their host plant. The mine has the form of a linear-blotch mine. Young larvae mine in a linear and full-depth mine, reaching the leaf margin and extending towards the tip of the leaf along the margin. The linear mine is brown or pale brown. Later, the mine extends into a blotch and turns pale greenish-brown. If the leaf is not big enough to complete the larval growth, the larva migrates to another leaf through the lower surface.

External links
Revisional Studies On The Family Lyonetiidae Of Japan (Lepidoptera)
Japanese Moths

Lyonetiidae
Moths of Japan